Afraid of Heights is the fourth studio album by the American surf rock group Wavves. The album was released on March 26, 2013 through Ghost Ramp, Warner Bros. Records and Mom + Pop Music.

Reception

Afraid of Heights received generally favorable reviews upon its release. At Metacritic, which assigns a normalized rating out of 100 to reviews from mainstream critics, the album has received an average score of 70, based on 26 reviews, indicating "generally favorable reviews".

Personnel
Nathan Williams - Vocals, rhythm and lead guitar, baritone guitar, drums (tracks 3, 10, 13), glockenspiel, keyboards
Stephen Pope - Vocals, bass guitar, baritone guitar, rhythm guitar, percussion
Jorma Vik - Drums
John Hill - Production, keyboards, programming

Track listing

References

2013 albums
Wavves albums
Mom + Pop Music albums
Warner Records albums